Harrison County is a county located in the U.S. state of Ohio. As of the 2020 census, the population was 14,483, making it the fifth-least populous county in Ohio. Its county seat and largest village is Cadiz. The county is named for General William Henry Harrison, who was later President of the United States.

History

Harrison County was formed from parts of Jefferson and Tuscarawas Counties in 1813.  The county was named after General William Henry Harrison, the hero of the battle of Tippecanoe in the War of 1812 (and later to become the 9th US president).

Oil was discovered near Jewett, Ohio in 1895, and then in the Scio, Ohio area in 1898.  However, by 1901, the Scio oil boom had essentially ceased.

Geography

On May 16, 2013, the Chicago Tribune Business section reported that the Utica Shale underlying Harrison County shows promise as a tight oil production zone.  To produce tight oil in large quantities would require horizontal drilling and fracturing of the shale formation as is being done in North Dakota and Texas.

Adjacent counties
Carroll County (north)
Jefferson County (east)
Belmont County (south)
Guernsey County (southwest)
Tuscarawas County (west)

Conotton Creek Trail
The Conotton Creek Trail is a rails-to-trails path that runs along Conotton Creek from Bowerston to Jewett in northern Harrison County, Ohio.

Demographics

2000 census
As of the census of 2000, there were 15,856 people, 6,398 households, and 4,516 families living in the county. The population density was 39 people per square mile (15/km2). There were 7,680 housing units at an average density of 19 per square mile (7/km2). The racial makeup of the county was 96.49% White, 2.19% Black or African American, 0.08% Native American, 0.11% Asian, 0.01% Pacific Islander, 0.09% from other races, and 1.03% from two or more races. 0.37% of the population were Hispanic or Latino of any race.

There were 6,398 households, out of which 29.1% had children under the age of 18 living with them, 58.5% were married couples living together, 8.8% had a female householder with no husband present, and 29.4% were non-families. 25.6% of all households were made up of individuals, and 13% had someone living alone who was 65 years of age or older. The average household size was 2.44 and the average family size was 2.92.

In the county, the population was spread out, with 23% under the age of 18, 6.9% from 18 to 24, 26.6% from 25 to 44, 25.8% from 45 to 64, and 17.7% who were 65 years of age or older. The median age was 41 years. For every 100 females there were 94.1 males. For every 100 females age 18 and over, there were 89.9 males.

The median income for a household in the county was $30,318, and the median income for a family was $36,646. Males had a median income of $30,485 versus $18,813 for females. The per capita income for the county was $16,479. 13.3% of the population and 11% of families were below the poverty line. 17.5% of those under the age of 18 and 8.4% of those 65 and older were living below the poverty line.

2010 census
As of the 2010 United States Census, there were 15,864 people, 6,526 households, and 4,452 families living in the county. The racial makeup of the county was 95.9% white, 2.1% black or African American, 0.1% Asian, 0.1% American Indian, 0.1% from other races, and 1.6% from two or more races. Those of Hispanic or Latino origin made up 0.5% of the population. In terms of ancestry, 20.9% were German, 15.5% were Irish, 9.0% were English, 8.9% were American, and 5.7% were Polish.

Of the 6,526 households, 28.1% had children under the age of 18 living with them, 53.4% were married couples living together, 9.5% had a female householder with no husband present, 31.8% were non-families, and 27.1% of all households were made up of individuals. The average household size was 2.40 and the average family size was 2.88. The median age was 44.4 years.

The median income for a household in the county was $35,363 and the median income for a family was $44,325. Males had a median income of $38,489 versus $24,063 for females. The per capita income for the county was $19,318. About 14.1% of families and 18.4% of the population were below the poverty line, including 26.3% of those under age 18 and 12.6% of those age 65 or over.

Politics
Harrison County was considered a swing county in presidential elections prior to 2016. The last Democrat to win the county was Bill Clinton in 1996, although Al Gore came within 66 votes in 2000 and Barack Obama came within 189 votes in 2008.

|}

Communities

Villages

Adena
Bowerston
Cadiz (county seat)
Deersville
Freeport
Harrisville
Hopedale
Jewett
New Athens
Scio

Townships

Archer
Athens
Cadiz
Franklin
Freeport
German
Green
Monroe
Moorefield
North
Nottingham
Rumley
Short Creek
Stock
Washington

Census-designated place
 Tippecanoe

Unincorporated communities

 Brownsville
 Conotton
 East Cadiz
 Georgetown
 Germano
 Laceyville
 Moorefield
 New Rumley
 Piedmont
 Smyrna
 Tappan

Notable residents
John Bingham - Representative to Congress and author of significant portions of the Fourteenth Amendment to the Constitution
Benjamin Cowen - Assistant Secretary of the Interior, who was principal political facilitator in establishing Yellowstone National Park and the idea that the use of national parks is for all Americans
George Custer - served in the American Civil War and was killed in the Battle of Little Big Horn
Thomas Custer - Medal of Honor recipient, and brother to George Custer
Clark Gable - actor
William Henry Holmes - anthropologist, archaeologist, geologist, and museum director
Edwin Stanton - Secretary of War in the Abraham Lincoln administration

See also
National Register of Historic Places listings in Harrison County, Ohio
Petroleum industry in Ohio

References

External links
Harrison County website
Harrison County Sheriff's Office

 
Appalachian Ohio
Counties of Appalachia
1813 establishments in Ohio
Populated places established in 1813